The Grand Erg Occidental (al-ʿIrq al-Gharbī al-Kabīr), (also known as the Western Sand Sea) is the second largest erg in northern Algeria after the Grand Erg Oriental. Certain crescent-shaped dunes, known as barchans, are actually mobile; the wind can push these dunes as much as 20 to 30 m (65–100 ft) in one year.

Geography
It is a desert natural region that receives less than 50 mm (1,96 in) of rainfall per year. The mean elevation of the Grand Erg Occidental is about 500 m, on average higher than the elevation of the Grand Erg Oriental, but not as high as the neighboring Tademaït to the southwest. This desolate region is a practically uninhabited area; there are no permanent villages and there are no roads crossing it.

Features

See also
Grand Erg Oriental
Geography of Algeria
List of ergs

References

Landforms of Algeria
Ergs of Africa
Deserts of Algeria
Natural regions of Africa
Geography of Adrar Province